The Auve is a river of the Marne department in the Grand Est region of France. It has its source at Auve and flows through Saint-Mard-sur-Auve, La Chapelle-Felcourt, Gizaucourt, Voilemont, Dommartin-Dampierre, Argers, Chaudefontaine and Sainte-Menehould, where it meets the Aisne.

References

Rivers of Marne (department)
Rivers of France
Rivers of Grand Est